The November 2013 San Francisco general elections were held on November 5, 2013, in San Francisco, California. The elections included one seat on the San Francisco Board of Supervisors, assessor-recorder, city attorney, and treasurer; and four ballot measures.

Board of Supervisors

District 4 

District 4 consists primarily of the Sunset district. Incumbent supervisor Katy Tang ran in her first election after being appointed by Mayor Ed Lee in the wake of Carmen Chu's resignation to be San Francisco Assessor-Recorder.

Assessor-Recorder 
One-term incumbent Carmen Chu, who was initially appointed by Mayor Ed Lee in February 2013, ran for her initial election unopposed.

City Attorney 
Three-term incumbent Dennis Herrera ran for reelection unopposed.

Treasurer 
Two-term incumbent José Cisneros ran for reelection unopposed.

Propositions 

Note: "City" refers to the San Francisco municipal government.

Proposition A 
Proposition A would require the Retiree Health Care Trust Fund to be fully funded or for certain budgetary criteria to be met before payments from the fund may be made.

Proposition B 
Proposition B would create a special district at 8 Washington Street, allowing for the development of residential units and commercial facilities with higher building height limits than currently zoned. Unlike Proposition C below, this measure is a ballot initiative filed by the project developer incorporating certain details of the entire project beyond building height limits.

Proposition C 
Proposition C would increase building height limits at 8 Washington Street. Unlike Proposition B above, this measure is a referendum on an ordinance passed by the San Francisco Board of Supervisors and only involves building height limits.

Proposition D 
Proposition D would make it City policy to utilize all available opportunities to lower the City's cost of prescription drugs and to ask state and federal representatives to sponsor legislation to reduce drug prices paid by the government.

External links
 San Francisco Department of Elections

San Francisco
2013
Elections
San Francisco